Nebria carpathica is a species of ground beetle in the Nebriinae subfamily that is endemic to Romania.

References

carpathica
Beetles described in 1850
Beetles of Europe
Endemic fauna of Romania